The B-segment is the second smallest of the European segments for passenger cars between the A-segment and C-segment, and commonly described as "small cars". The B-segment is the largest segment in Europe by volume, accounting for 20 percent of total car sales in 2020 according to JATO Dynamics.

Definition 
The European segments are not based on size or weight criteria. In some cases, the same car may be differently positioned depending on the market.

The Euro NCAP vehicle class called "Supermini" also includes smaller A-segment cars alongside B-segment cars.

In Britain, the term "supermini" is more widely used for B-segment hatchbacks. The term was developed in the 1970s as an informal categorisation, and by 1977 was used regularly by the British newspaper The Times. By the mid-1980s, it had widespread use in Britain.

In Germany, the term "small cars" has been endorsed by the Federal Motor Transport Authority (KBA) equivalent to the B-segment. The segment accounts for 15.1 percent of total car registrations in the country in 2020.

History 

The term supermini, which precedes the B-segment term emerged in the UK in the 1970s, as car manufacturers sought a new design to surpass the influential Mini, launched in 1959, and journalists attempted to categorise such a vehicle. The car which is widely regarded as the first modern supermini is the Autobianchi A112, launched in 1969. It was later followed by the Fiat 127, Renault 5, VW Polo and Honda Civic, which are similar in concept and size.

These supermini or B-segment cars were considered to feature better comfort and convenience, with the safety and surefootedness of the Mini’s front-wheel drive/transverse engine package. That meant the addition of a hatchback and folding rear seats. The oil crisis in the 1970s was also argued to increase supermini market share.

In 1976, Ford launched the Ford Fiesta which became popular. The segment began to be more popular in the 1980s. By the mid-1980s, the term supermini had become established as a formal car classification term, eventually being adopted in European Commission classification as the B-segment.

The 1990 Renault Clio and 1983 Fiat Uno were significant models in the supermini or the B-segment, being the recipients of the European Car of the Year award. The Clio replaced the long-running Renault 5, although the latter remained in production until 1996. In 1993, the Nissan Micra (K11), became the first Japanese car company to be receive the European Car of the Year award. In 1999, the Toyota Yaris received the European Car of the Year award, and was noted for its high roof which allowed for improved interior space. Another notable model is the Opel Corsa, which was the best-selling car in the world in the year 1998 thanks to its extensive international presence. It recorded a global sales of 910,839 units that year, in which 54 percent was contributed by its European sales. It took the world number one spot from the Toyota Corolla at 906,953 sales.

Safety and performance 
Safety features have improved for the cars in the segment. In 1995, both petrol and diesel B-segment vehicles had only around 40 percent of the listed safety options installed (side impact bars, driver/passenger airbag, side airbag, ABS, electronic braking system, stability control), whereas by 2010 they were averaging over 90 percent. This represents a significant improvement in vehicle safety over the period, despite petrol and diesel B-segment vehicles averaging an inflation-adjusted price increase of 6 percent and 15 percent respectively.

Studies from the European Union and JATO has found that the average maximum power output of B-segment vehicles has increased by 40 percent between 1995 and 2010, while the average overall vehicle weight only increased by around 20 percent in the same period. Fuel consumption has decreased by around 20 percent, and power-to-weight ratio has increased by 15 percent.

Body styles 
Hatchbacks are the most popular body style for the segment. While the majority are equipped with five doors, many European-oriented hatchbacks are offered with both three-door and five-door versions, with 31 percent of European customers opting for three-door B-segment hatchbacks by 2007. This share decreased to 13 percent in 2016 due to shifts in market preferences, moving towards usability and practicality. As a result, by the late 2010s, a number of manufacturers had stopped offering three-door versions of its B-segment hatchback models in Europe.

Other less common body styles currently available in the segment in Europe are saloons (example: Dacia Logan), estates (example: Dacia Logan MCV and Škoda Fabia Combi), and coupes/convertibles (example: Mini Cooper Cabrio/Convertible).

Sales 
European sales of B-segment cars were down by 25 percent in 2020 to 2.24 million units.

In 2020 the fifteen highest selling B-segment cars in Europe were the Renault Clio, Peugeot 208, Opel/Vauxhall Corsa, Toyota Yaris, Volkswagen Polo, Dacia Sandero, Ford Fiesta, Citroën C3, Mini, Renault Zoe, Skoda Fabia, Hyundai i20, Seat Ibiza, Audi A1 and Suzuki Swift. 

200,000–300,000 sales (Best-Selling)100,000–200,000 sales50,000–100,000 sales

Sales figures in Europe 

Notes:

Jump in total sales after 2019 year is because premium cars are included.

From 2013 to 2018 premium cars are not included in total sales (sales are marked by "x").

Premium brands and models are marked italic.

Electric cars are included in B-segment.

Electric vehicles 

One of the first mass-market electric B-segment cars in Europe was the Renault Zoe, released in 2012. Global sales of the Zoe achieved the 50,000 unit milestone in June 2016, and 200,000 units by March 2020. Other manufacturers followed suit; Groupe PSA introduced the Peugeot e-208 and Opel Corsa-e in 2019, while Honda followed with the low-volume Honda e, and Mini with their Mini Electric.

Equivalents 
The B-segment is considered as the European equivalent to the subcompact category widely known in North America, the A0-class in China, and the supermini category for B-segment hatchbacks in Great Britain.

List of vehicles

See also 
 A-segment
 C-segment
 Car classifications
 Euro Car Segment
 Subcompact

References 

Euro car segments